The Open Artificial Pancreas System (OpenAPS) project is a free and open-source project that aims to make basic artificial pancreas system (APS) technology available to everyone. The OpenAPS project was designed with the idea of quickly getting the APS technology to more people using a direct approach, rather than waiting for clinical trials to be completed and FDA approval to be granted as is traditional.

History 

OpenAPS traces its origin to 2013, when Dana M. Lewis and Scott Leibrand became aware of privately shared software created by John Costik. This software (which also led to development of the Nightscout project) enabled access and transfer of continuous glucose monitor (CGM) data to cloud computing infrastructure. Lewis, a Type 1 Diabetes patient, was dissatisfied with her commercial device: the device's alarm for hypoglycemic status (which can be life-threatening, if untreated) was too quiet to wake Dana up while sleeping. To address this, Lewis and Leibrand extended the CGM-in-the-cloud software to create a custom high volume alarm. After this initial project, they then used the same CGM-in-the-cloud software to create the Do-It-Yourself Pancreas System (DIYPS) software, which provided a decision assist system for insulin delivery.

This decision automation was able to become a "closed loop" with the help of an open source decoding-carelink project created by Ben West to communicate with Medtronic insulin pumps, enabling data retrieval and issuance of insulin-dosing commands to pumps that support it. With this update, the DIYPS system became "OpenAPS".

Lewis has since presented the OpenAPS at conferences, and has been profiled in various news articles.

Software

The OpenAPS software can run on a small computer such as a Raspberry Pi or Intel Edison and automates an insulin pump's insulin delivery to keep blood glucose in a target range. It does this by monitoring CGM data, algorithmically determining when insulin doses should occur, and issuing commands to the insulin pump to deliver these doses. OpenAPS is a subset of a broader "CGM in the Cloud" social movement; this includes the Nightscout project, which allows CGM users access to their blood sugar data in real time by putting the data in the cloud. , the OpenAPS project estimates that over 360 people worldwide with various OpenAPS implementations, amounting to over 1.6 million real-world testing hours.

Regulatory concerns 

As with the Nightscout project more generally and as a non-commercial open source project, OpenAPS has not been regulated by the FDA; this has raised some regulatory concerns, particularly since each user builds their own implementation of the system.

This has also raised some ethical concerns. The OpenAPS project emphasizes a "use at your own risk" approach, with the following disclaimer:

Commercial alternatives 

In September 2016, subsequent to the development of OpenAPS, the FDA released its first approval for an automated insulin delivery device for type 1 diabetes: Medtronic’s MiniMed 670G hybrid closed looped system.

References

See also 

 Open Insulin Project, an open source biohacking project aiming to produce medical-grade insulin
 List of open-source health software

Diabetes-related supplies and medical equipment
Free medical software